Stowport is a rural residential locality in the local government area (LGA) of Burnie in the North-west and west LGA region of Tasmania. The 2016 census has a population of 404 for the state suburb of Stowport.
It includes Glance Creek in its population statistics.

While there is some residential allotments the area is mainly agricultural farming land. One of the historical farms was called "Karingal" . Chasm Creek Runs down through the property.

There is a community hall (Stowport Hall) and a local butchery.

Glance Creek Estate, a winery established in 2011, is located in Stowport near Burnie in Northern Tasmania. It produces grapes and various fruit wines including myrtus and blueberry.

History 
Stowport was used as a parish name in 1856, and a town plan was produced about 1900. Stowport was gazetted as a locality in 1966.

Geography
The Blythe River forms the eastern boundary, and Emu River forms the western.

Road infrastructure 
The C102 route (Stowport Road / Natone Road) passes through from north-west to south-east. Route C113 (Minna Road) starts at an intersection with C102 and runs north-east until it exits. Route C114 (Upper Stowport Road) starts at an intersection with C102 and runs south until it exits.

Sport

Cricket
The Stowport Cricket Club compete in the Burnie Cricket league.

References

External links 
Dogs Homes of Tasmania

Suburbs of Burnie, Tasmania
Towns in Tasmania